

List of Ambassadors
Israel's past and current ambassadors to Poland:
 Yacov Livne since 2021
 Alexander Ben-Zvi 2019-2021
 Anna Azari 2014 - 2019
 Zvi Rav-Ner 2009 - 2014
 David Peleg 2004 - 2009
 Shevah Weiss 2001 - 2004
 Yigal Antebi (diplomat) 1997 - 2001
 Gershon Zohar 1993 - 1997
 Miron Gordon 1990 - 1993
 Mordechai David Palzur, 1986 - 1990
 Dov Sattath 1964 - 1967
 Ambassador Avigdor Dagan 1961 - 1964
 Minister Rehavam Amir 1958 - 1961
 Minister Katriel Katz 1956 - 1958
 Minister Arieh Leon Kubovy (Non-Resident, Prague) 1951 - 1952
 Minister Israel Barzilay 1948 - 1951

References

Poland
Israel